CAOBISCO is the Association of Chocolate, Biscuits and Confectionery ( industries of Europe. Created in 1959 in Paris, the association has been based in Brussels since 1985.

CAOBISCO’s role is to facilitate the understanding of European decision-makers and stakeholders on the role played by European chocolate, biscuit, and confectionery manufacturers and products in the European economy. It also acts as a platform of dialogue and communication with European institutions in terms of scientific and regulatory matters, as well as economic and sustainability issues. CAOBISCO members include national associations in Europe as well as direct member companies.

Activities 
Areas of activities include:
 Reforms of the Common Agricultural Policy
 Security of quality raw materials supplies
 Trade liberalisation, including tariff and non-tariff barriers
 Responsible and sustainable raw materials sourcing
 Productivity and quality improvements 
 Food law
 Food safety

References

External links

 International Labour Organisation
 CEN (European Committee for Standardization)
 FoodDrinkEurope
 Sustainable Cocoa Initiative
 Chococlic
 
 
 
 
 
 
 
 
 
 
 
 
 
 

International organisations based in Belgium
Organizations established in 1959
1959 establishments in France
Organisations based in Brussels
Chocolate organizations
Business organizations based in Europe